Katherine Briçonnet (ca. 1494–1526) was a French noblewoman, daughter of Guillaume Briçonnet and wife of .

She was influential in designing the Château de Chenonceau. Her husband had purchased the site which contained the ruins of an earlier fortress as he wished to build a Renaissance château there. It was Katherine who supervised the construction work between 1513 and 1521, taking important architectural decisions while her husband was away fighting in the Italian wars. In particular, she oversaw the construction of the practically designed staircase which proceeds straight upwards rather than in a spiral as was usual at the time. In 1524, shortly after the building had been completed, Thomas Bohier died. Katherine died two years later. The initials TBH (Thomas Bohier and Katherine) can still be seen as well as a motto carved on the door: "S'il vient à point, me souviendra (If I manage to build Chenonceau, I will be remembered). The original part of the château completed under Katherine Briçonnet is known as the Château des Dames as it was later extended by Diane de Poitiers and Catherine de Médicis.

See also
Women in architecture

References

1494 births
1526 deaths
16th-century French architects
French women architects